Hanover High School is the name of several secondary schools in the United States:

Hanover High School (Massachusetts) — Hanover, Massachusetts
Hanover High School (New Hampshire) — Hanover, New Hampshire
Hanover High School (Pennsylvania) — Hanover, Pennsylvania
Hanover High School (Mechanicsville, Virginia) — Mechanicsville, Virginia
Hanover Central Junior-Senior High School — Cedar Lake, Indiana
Hanover-Horton High School — Horton, Michigan
Hanover Junior-Senior High School — Colorado Springs, Colorado
Hanover Park High School — East Hanover, New Jersey
New Hanover High School — Wilmington, North Carolina